Emilio del Toro Cuebas (June 4, 1876 in Cabo Rojo, Puerto Rico – November 10, 1955 in Carolina, Puerto Rico) served as Chief Justice of the Supreme Court of Puerto Rico from 1909 until 1922.

Born in Cabo Rojo, Puerto Rico in 1876, earned his degree in law from the University of Havana in 1897. Began his career in the private practice in 1898, seven years later began his juridical career. Served as Prosecutor for the District courts of Humacao and San Juan.  Later became Assistant attorney General of Puerto Rico appointed as Supreme Court prosecutor and Judge of the San Juan District Court. In 1909 was appointed Associate Justice of the Puerto Rico Supreme Court by president William Howard Taft and in 1922 was appointed chief justice by president Warren G. Harding. Held that position until his retirement in 1943. Died November 10, 1955. Was buried at the Puerto Rico Memorial Cemetery in Carolina, Puerto Rico.

Sources 

La Justicia en sus Manos, by Luis Rafael Rivera, 2007, 

|-

1876 births
1955 deaths
Associate Justices of the Supreme Court of Puerto Rico
Chief Justices of the Supreme Court of Puerto Rico
People from Cabo Rojo, Puerto Rico
Puerto Rican lawyers
University of Havana alumni